Isola di Fondra is a comune (municipality) in the Province of Bergamo in the Italian region of Lombardy, located about  northeast of Milan and about  north of Bergamo.  It is formed by three hamlets, Fondra, Pusdosso and  Trabuchello.

Isola di Fondra borders the following municipalities: Branzi, Moio de' Calvi, Piazzatorre, Roncobello.

References